Riverhill House is a Grade II listed rag-stone Queen Anne manor house located on the southern edge of Sevenoaks in Kent, England. The gardens are  open to the public from March to September.

Originally built on the site of a Tudor farmstead in 1714, Riverhill House and estate were purchased in 1840 by John Rogers. A keen botanist and a contemporary of Charles Darwin, Rogers purchased the property because of its sheltered location and lime-free soil. Rogers was an early member of the Royal Horticultural Society and a patron of Victorian plant-hunters.

The house has been enlarged and improved since then, by subsequent generations of the Rogers family up until 1900. Today the house is still a family home in private ownership of the Rogers family.

The Riverhill estate includes gardens first established by John Rogers in 1842. The huge Turkey oak at the front of the house was brought back as an acorn by a previous owner returning from the Crimean War. The garden also has cedar trees planted in the 1840s.

In March 2010 Riverhill House was the subject of a Channel 4 television documentary presented by hotelier Ruth Watson as part of the Country House Rescue series. The documentary featured the current owner and director of the house Jane Margaret Rogers and leading maze designer Adrian Fisher.

References

External links
 Riverhill House and Gardens homepage
 Country House Rescue - Riverhill House
 Photo with slideshow of Riverhill House

Country houses in Kent
Buildings and structures in Sevenoaks
Grade II listed houses
Grade II listed buildings in Kent
Gardens in Kent
Houses completed in 1714
1714 establishments in England